Abu al-Hasan Ahmad ibn Muhammad al-Tabari, born in Amol, was a 10th-century Persian physician from  Tabaristan. He was the physician of Rukn al-Dawla, a Buyid ruler.

He was author of a compendium of medicine Kitab al-mu'alaja al-buqratiya (Hippocratic  treatments), in ten books. It is extant only in Arabic language.
Tabari has written valuable articles on different medical sciences; however, he is especially famous for authoring the al-Mu'alajat al-Buqratiya (Hippocratic Treatments) - an important medical encyclopedia. Several of Al-Tabari's succeeding scholars and physician have referred to the al-Mu'alajat al-Buqratiya in their medical articles. The aim of this study is further introduction of this great physician and assessment of his theories and key works.

Sources

F. Wüstenfeld, Arabschen Aerzte (56, 1840).

See also
Medicine in the medieval Islamic world
List of Iranian scientists

10th-century Iranian physicians
People from Amol
People under the Buyid dynasty
Medical writers